The ODAC men's basketball tournament is the annual conference basketball championship tournament for the NCAA Division III Old Dominion Athletic Conference. The tournament has been held annually since 1977. It is a single-elimination tournament and seeding is based on regular season records.

The winner, declared conference champion, receives the ODAC's automatic bid to the NCAA Men's Division III Basketball Championship.

Results

Championship records

 Ferrum and Shenandoah have yet to reach an ODAC tournament final.
 Mary Baldwin never advanced to the final as an ODAC member.
 Averett is playing its first ODAC season in 2022–23.
 Schools highlighted in pink are former members of the ODAC

References

NCAA Division III men's basketball conference tournaments
Basketball Tournament, Men's
Recurring sporting events established in 1977